The 2005–06 Northwestern State Demons basketball team represented Northwestern State University during the 2005–06 NCAA Division I men's basketball season. The Demons, led by 7th year head coach Mike McConathy, played their home games at Prather Coliseum and were members of the Southland Conference. They finished the season 26–8, 15–1 in Southland play to win the regular season title. They were champions of the Southland Conference tournament, winning the championship game over Stephen F. Austin, to earn an automatic bid to the 2006 NCAA tournament. As No. 14 seed in the Atlanta region, Northwestern State knocked off No. 3 seed Iowa by draining a corner three with time running out. The Demons were then beaten by No. 6 seed West Virginia in the second round.

Roster

Schedule and results
 
, 
|-
!colspan=9 style=| Non-conference Regular season

|-
!colspan=9 style=| Southland Regular season

|-
!colspan=9 style=| 2006 Southland Conference tournament

|-
!colspan=9 style=|2006 NCAA tournament

References

Northwestern State
Northwestern State
Northwestern State Demons basketball seasons
2005 in sports in Louisiana
2006 in sports in Louisiana